KASP-LP (107.9 MHz FM) is a low-power radio station rebroadcasting NOAA Weather Radio station WWG43 in Glenwood Springs, Colorado. Licensed to Aspen, Colorado, United States, it serves the Aspen area.  The station is currently owned by the Colorado Department of Transportation.

See also
NOAA Weather Radio All Hazards

External links
GJT NOAA Weather Radio Info
GJT More NWR Info
 

ASP-LP
ASP-LP
Government of Colorado
Companies based in Pitkin County, Colorado
Radio stations established in 2002
2002 establishments in Colorado